Joel Hodgson (born 1 August 1992) is an English rugby union player who plays for Utah Warriors in Major League Rugby (MLR). He previously played for Newcastle Falcons and Northampton Saints in the Aviva Premiership.

Rugby Union career

Professional career

He first started with Newcastle Falcons from the summer of 2010. He was loaned out to Rotherham Titans. On 13 June 2014, he left Kingston Park to join Northampton Saints from the 2014-15 season in the Aviva Premiership. After one season at Northampton, he departed to join Yorkshire Carnegie on a one-year deal in the RFU Championship from the 2015-16 season. On 21 April 2016, it was announced he would rejoin Newcastle Falcons.

On 3 August 2022 it was announced that he joined Glasgow Warriors in a short-term deal. He came on a replacement in the friendly match against Ayrshire Bulls on 2 September 2022.

On 13 August 2022 it was announced that he joined Utah Warriors to play in the Major League Rugby.

International career

He played for England U18 at scrum-half; and then moved to fly-half with England u19s.

References

External links

Newcastle Falcons Profile

Living people
Glasgow Warriors players
Newcastle Falcons players
1992 births
Rugby union fly-halves
Rugby union scrum-halves
Rugby union players from Newcastle upon Tyne
Northampton Saints players
Leeds Tykes players
Rotherham Titans players
Utah Warriors players